Plesy may refer to the following places in Poland:
Plęsy, Łódź Voivodeship (central Poland)
Plęsy, Warmian-Masurian Voivodeship (north Poland)
Płęsy, Pomeranian Voivodeship (north Poland)